David Owen Sillence  (born 1944) is an academic and medical geneticist. He is an emeritus professor at the University of Sydney, where he was the foundation chair (Professor) of Medical Genetics. An honours graduate of the University of Sydney, he obtained his MD in Medical Genetics from the University of Melbourne 1978 in bone dysplasia.

Sillence was a founding member of the Human Genetics Society of Australasia (1978), the Australian Teratology Society (1981), the Australian Faculty of Public Health Medicine (1990), and the American College of Medical Genetics (1993) and has held office in the Human Genetics Society of Australasia from 1981 to 2000, often with more than one concurrent position. He has also held office in the Royal Australasian College of Physicians from 1994 to 2000. He has been a member of many committees within the School of Public Health and Tropical Medicine, and the University of Sydney. He currently serves on the International Nomenclature Committee for Constitutional Disorders of the Skeleton, the International mucopolysaccharidosis type I expert committee, the National Fabry Disease and MPS expert committees for the LSDP.

Sillence was instrumental in establishing the first working party to write guidelines for training in Clinical Genetics in Australia and was granted Clinical Geneticist status (1987) through the grandfather clause. This certification model has been used by other Special Interest Groups within the Human Genetics Society of Australasia. He has been involved in a considerable amount of collaborative research as well as those within his department. He has published over 130 original articles, has contributed over 30 book chapters, 8 books/monographs, and has contributed to conference proceedings more than a dozen times. He has been a peer reviewer/editor to 8 different groups/journals.

Sillence created the standard four-type system of osteogenesis imperfecta in 1979. It enabled progress into the molecular causes of the disorder and collagen mutations.

In 2012, Sillence delivered the Human Genetics Society of Australasia Oration, a prestigious lecture in his field.

Sillence was made a Member of the Order of Australia (AM) in the 2013 Australia Day Honours.

References

Living people
Australian geneticists
Medical researchers
Medical geneticists
Australian clinical geneticists
Fellows of the Royal Australasian College of Physicians
University of Sydney alumni
Academic staff of the University of Sydney
University of Melbourne alumni
1944 births